The Unforgiven is the ninth full-length studio album recorded by the various M.S.G. lineups and the sixth studio album by the hard rock band Michael Schenker Group released in 1999 .

Track listing
All music by Michael Schenker, all lyrics by Kelly Keeling

 "Rude Awakening" – 5:02 
 "The Mess I've Made" – 4:31
 "In and Out of Time" – 3:44 
 "Hello Angel" – 5:13
 "Fat City N.O." – 4:16
 "Tower" – 5:11
 "Pilot of Your Soul" – 4:25
 "Forever and More" – 5:43 
 "Turning off the Emotion" – 5:15
 "Live for Today" – 4:40
 "Illusion" – 3:57
 "The Storm" – 5:18

Personnel
Band members
Kelly Keeling - lead vocals
Michael Schenker - lead and rhythm guitars
Seth "Sneef" Bernstein - keyboards and additional rhythm guitars
John Onder - bass guitar
Shane Gaalaas - drums

Additional musicians
Jesse Bradman - keyboards on tracks 4, 8, 12 and background vocals on tracks 5, 11
Louis Maldonado - rhythm guitar on "Rude Awakening" and background vocals on "Fat City N.O."

Production
Michael Schenker, Mike Varney - producers
Mark 'Mooka' Rennick, Ralph Patlan - engineers, mixing
Joe Marquez - engineer
Gene Cornelius, Robert McGraw - assistant engineers
Greg Schnitzer - mastering at Prairie Sun Recording Studios, Cotati, California
Dave Stephens - graphic design

Charts

References

1999 albums
Michael Schenker Group albums
Albums produced by Mike Varney
SPV/Steamhammer albums